"Looking for You" is a song recorded by Canadian singer Justin Bieber featuring Atlanta-based hip-hop trio Migos. He shared the song through SoundCloud on May 29, 2014. Written by Kevin Cossom, Bieber and all three members of Migos, it was produced by Danja and Bangladesh. Lyrically, "Looking for You" describes the partying lifestyle and finding a lover while there at the party. It was the second song released on Bieber's SoundCloud in 2014, the previous being "We Were Born for This" a month earlier in April.



Background and release 
In early June 2014, shortly after the song's release, Migos told MTV about recording the song with Bieber, who visited them in February 2014: "He was in Atlanta, he came to our city and we linked with him. It wasn't no 'send' situation -- we [were] in the booth and working with him was pretty cool. He's laid back, he be chillin', he's a young nigga so it was fun. We knocked it out in about 20 minutes like we'd do any other track," they added. "It wasn't no pressure or nothing like that."

Composition 
The track describes Bieber entering a club with Migos at his side, finding a girl there who he is attracted to but can't lose. He reminds her that he'll be looking for her because of this. Quavo, Takeoff and Offset take turns respectively rapping about pulling up to the club with Bieber, their lifestyle and their fame.

References 

2014 singles
2014 songs
Justin Bieber songs
Migos songs
Songs written by Justin Bieber
Songs written by Quavo
Songs written by Offset (rapper)
Songs written by Takeoff (rapper)